If You Could See Me Now may refer to:
"If You Could See Me Now" (1946 song), a 1946 jazz standard, composed by Tadd Dameron
"If You Could See Me Now", a 1992 song by Celine Dion from Celine Dion
"If You Could See Me Now" (The Script song), 2013
If You Could See Me Now (Etta Jones album), 1979
 If You Could See Me Now (Kenny Drew album), 1974
If You Could See Me Now (Oscar Peterson album), 1983
If You Could See Me Now (Straub novel), 1977 novel by Peter Straub
If You Could See Me Now (Ahern novel), 2005 novel by Cecelia Ahern